The Ban is a left tributary of the river Crasna in Romania. It discharges into the Crasna in the town Crasna.

References

Rivers of Romania
Rivers of Sălaj County